This list of Chinese University of Hong Kong alumni includes notable graduates and non-graduate former students from the Chinese University of Hong Kong, a public research university in Shatin, Hong Kong. Established in 1963 by a charter granted by the Legislative Council of Hong Kong. It is the territory's second oldest university and was founded as a federation of three existing colleges – Chung Chi College, New Asia College and United College – the oldest of which was founded in 1949.

Today, CUHK is organised into nine constituent colleges and eight academic faculties, and remains the only collegiate university in the territory. The university operates in both English and Chinese, although classes in most colleges are taught in English.

Academia and research

Arts and entertainment

Business and finance

Government, law, and public policy

Journalism and media

Religion

Social reformers/activists

Sports

Notes 
 Blank cells indicate missing information; em-dashes (—) in the "Class year(s)" column indicate that the alumnus attended but never graduated from CUHK; em-dashes (—) in the "College" column indicate that the alumnus didn't attend CUHK as an undergraduate, and therefore wasn't a member of a college

References 

Chinese University of Hong Kong